Angelo Raffin (born April 27, 1946) was a Canadian football player who played for the Montreal Alouettes and Toronto Argonauts. He won the Grey Cup with Montreal in 1970.

References

1946 births
Living people
Canadian football offensive linemen
Montreal Alouettes players
Toronto Argonauts players
Italian emigrants to Canada
Italian players of Canadian football